In 2015, Andy Burnham, the Member of Parliament for Leigh, stood as a candidate for leadership of the Labour Party in the United Kingdom. His candidacy was announced upon the release of a YouTube video on 15 May 2015. His announcement involved the promise to "rediscover the beating heart of Labour" and appeal to the aspirations "of everyone".

Burnham was initially considered the frontrunner in the race to succeed Ed Miliband. However the emergence of Jeremy Corbyn as the candidate representing the left-wing faction of the party, in June 2015, and the consequent growth in support for Corbyn's campaign saw Burnham's lead diminish to the point that Corbyn overtook him – this was first reflected in a YouGov poll published by The Times on 21 July.

Economic policy
In his official manifesto, Burnham pledged to offer "a balanced plan for a strong economy and sound public finances, providing a genuine alternative to Osborne's punishing austerity". His platform involved re-balancing the tax system, by restoring the 50p income tax rate that had been cut in the 2012 budget. He also signaled that he would not introduce the 'mansion tax' that was included in Labour's 2015 election manifesto, calling the proposal "the politics of envy". His other policies included increasing the minimum wage and scrapping the youth rate, to create a "true living wage for all ages" and abolishing zero-hour contracts and unpaid internships. He also announced that he would address the house price and rent crisis by giving councils greater freedom and increased borrowing powers to build more houses, regulate the private rented sector and introduce a land value tax on commercial properties.

In August 2015, Burnham announced that he would commit Labour to "a policy of progressive re-nationalisation" of the railway system. There was some speculation in the media that the announcement was an attempt by the Burnham campaign to align itself further to the left of the party and win back voters it had lost to the Corbyn campaign, as nationalisation had formed a key part of Corbyn's economic policy. He continued to voice his opposition to the TTIP free trade agreement between the European Union and the United States, arguing that it would undermine the National Health Service, as it would "open the floodgates" to private healthcare providers. He was also in favour of building a third runway at Heathrow Airport.

Domestic policy

Education
During his time as Shadow Education Secretary between 2010 and 2011, Burnham indicated his belief in revitalising the comprehensive education system – a view that he maintained in his leadership election manifesto. He pledged to reject the "growing market of free schools and academies", replace tuition fees with a new graduate tax, and end the charitable status held by private schools.

National Care Service
One of Burnham's key policies was to integrate social care into the National Health Service. This was a policy that Burnham had first proposed in 2010 as Health Secretary in Gordon Brown's government, and then kept as a manifesto commitment during his campaign for party leader in 2010 and as Shadow Health Secretary in Ed Miliband's shadow cabinet. In July 2015, on the 70th anniversary of Labour's 1945 election landslide, Burnham announced that he would establish a "Beveridge-style commission" to look into possible means of funding such proposals.

Welfare
Following the announcement by Harriet Harman, the acting Leader of the Opposition, that she would position the party to abstain on Iain Duncan Smith's Welfare Reform and Work Bill at its Second Reading in July 2015, Burnham reportedly clashed with her at a shadow cabinet meeting, by arguing that the party should table an amendment instead. However, when the opposition's amendment failed, Burnham followed the party whip by abstaining. Burnham sought to justify his failure to oppose the bill by stating that, if he had defied Harman, he would have caused a major split, consequently weakening the party.

In September 2015, Burnham conceded, in an interview with The Independent, that his abstention had been a major turning point in the campaign and may have cost him the leadership.

Foreign policy

Controversies
Burnham attracted press criticism for claiming £17,000 a year from the taxpayer to rent a London flat, despite owning another within walking distance of the House of Commons. A spokesman for Burnham said that renting out the original flat was necessary to "cover his costs" as parliamentary rule changes meant he was no longer able to claim for mortgage interest expenses.

Burnham was criticised for saying that Labour should have a woman leader "when the time is right", with the New Statesman saying that he had "tripped over his mouth again". He also said that he would resign from the Shadow Cabinet if Labour supported leaving NATO, something which frontrunner Jeremy Corbyn had suggested.

Burnham was criticised for refusing to be interviewed by "The Sun" when it emerged he had given an interview to the newspaper during his previous run for the Labour leadership, and been photographed in the back of a cab for "The Sun".

Opinion polling

When Ed Miliband resigned on the day following the 2015 general election, Burnham was the bookies' favourite to succeed him as party leader. This was reflected in the first opinion polls that were released days later, with Burnham holding a lead over Chuka Umunna and Yvette Cooper, although the number of undecided voters had the greatest share of the vote. This continued following the PLP nomination deadline, as a poll by The Independent, published on 24 June, showed him opening up an 11-point lead, although Jeremy Corbyn's polling numbers had increased to 25%, from 11% in the previous week.

Endorsements

See also
Andy Burnham
2015 Labour Party leadership election (UK)
2015 Jeremy Corbyn Labour Party leadership campaign

References

External links
Campaign website
Labour Party website

2015 in British politics
2015 Labour Party (UK) leadership election
Burnham, Andy
Andy Burnham Labour Party leadership campaign